Module is the name under which Wellington-based New Zealand musician Jeramiah Ross has released his work since 2003. He composes and produces Downtempo, Ambient, and Classical music. Ross has released several albums and has contributed to soundtracks of video games such as Shatter and Robot Unicorn Attack 2.

Discography

Albums 
2006 – Remarkable Engines
2009 – Shatter – The Official Video Game Soundtrack
2012 – Imagineering
2013 – PROGAMMA!
2017 – Starlight Wonders 
2018 – Khemikal Reaction

References

Musicians from Wellington